The 46th General Assembly of Nova Scotia represented Nova Scotia between February 27, 1957, and April 16, 1960.

Division of seats

There were 43 members of the General Assembly, elected in the 1956 Nova Scotia general election.

List of members

Former members of the 46th General Assembly

References 

Terms of the General Assembly of Nova Scotia
1956 establishments in Nova Scotia
1960 disestablishments in Nova Scotia
20th century in Nova Scotia